Catherine Dean May (May 18, 1914 – May 28, 2004) was a U.S. Representative from Washington. She was the first woman elected to Congress in the state of Washington.

Early life, education, and career
May was born as Catherine Dean Barnes in Yakima, Washington and graduated from Yakima Valley Junior College, in 1934. She earned her B.S. from the University of Washington, Seattle, Washington in 1936 and her teaching certificate in 1937. She attended the University of Southern California in Los Angeles, California in 1939.

She taught English at Chehalis High School from 1937 to 1940 and was women's editor and a news broadcaster in Tacoma, Washington in 1941 and 1942.  She headed the radio department for a Seattle advertising agency from 1942 to 1943, and a Seattle insurance company from 1943 to 1944.  She then became a writer and assistant commentator for the National Broadcasting Company in New York City from 1944 to 1946 before returning to the Northwest to become women's editor at station KIT in Yakima from 1948 to 1957. She worked as an office manager and medical secretary at the Yakima Medical Center in 1957 and 1958 and served as president of Bedell Associates.

Political career
May served as member of the Washington State House of Representatives from 1952 to 1958. She was the first woman from the state of Washington elected to the U.S. House of Representatives.

In 1958, May was elected as a Republican to the Eighty-sixth United States Congress. She was subsequently re-elected five times, serving from January 3, 1959 until January 3, 1971. She was the first woman elected to Congress from Washington. While in Congress, May served on the House Agriculture Committee, ranking member of the House Beauty Shop Committee, and the Joint Committee on Atomic Energy.

Upon her marriage to Donald W. Bedell on November 14, 1970, she was known as Catherine May Bedell.

She was an unsuccessful candidate for reelection to the Ninety-second Congress in 1970 and subsequently served on the United States International Trade Commission from 1971 to 1975 and again from 1979 through 1980. In 1982, she was a Special Consultant to the President on the 50 States Project. In 2004, she was the president of Bedell Associates in Palm Desert, California.

She died on May 28, 2004 in Rancho Mirage, California.

See also
 Women in the United States House of Representatives

References

External links
 A Few Good Women...The Honorable Catherine May Bedell

1914 births
2004 deaths
20th-century American educators
20th-century American politicians
20th-century American women politicians
American commentators
American radio journalists
Schoolteachers from Washington (state)
20th-century American women educators
Female members of the United States House of Representatives
Republican Party members of the Washington House of Representatives
News editors
International Trade Commission personnel
People from Rancho Mirage, California
Politicians from Yakima, Washington
Radio personalities from Washington (state)
Republican Party members of the United States House of Representatives from Washington (state)
University of Southern California alumni
University of Washington alumni
American women editors
American women radio journalists
Women state legislators in Washington (state)
21st-century American women